Sameh Saeed Mujbel Al-Mamoori (born May 26, 1992) is an Iraqi footballer  who plays as a right back for Al-Quwa Al-Jawiya in the Iraqi Premier League. He is the younger brother of Samal Saeed and Samer Saeed.

International career
On September 4, 2014 Sameh made his International debut against Peru in a friendly match that ended 2–0 loss.

Honours

Club
Al-Quwa Al-Jawiya
 Iraqi Premier League: 2016–17, 2020–21
 Iraq FA Cup: 2015–16, 2020–21
 AFC Cup: 2016, 2017, 2018

References

External links
 
 profile on facebook.com

1992 births
Living people
Iraqi footballers
Iraq international footballers
Sportspeople from Baghdad
Amanat Baghdad players
2015 AFC Asian Cup players
Association football fullbacks
Asian Games medalists in football
Footballers at the 2014 Asian Games
Asian Games bronze medalists for Iraq
Medalists at the 2014 Asian Games
AFC Cup winning players